Edward Boland nicknamed "Paddy" was an Australian rugby league footballer who played in the 1900s and 1910s.  He played for North Sydney and played in 1 match for Cumberland.  Boland was a foundation player for North Sydney and served on the committee when the club was first admitted into the league.

Playing career
Boland played in North Sydney's first ever game which was in Round 1 1908 against South Sydney at Birchgrove Oval with the game ending in a 11–7 loss.  

Boland also played 1 match for Cumberland in 1908 against Norths.  Cumberland attended the match with only 11 players from a required 13.  Boland was one of the players who decided to join Cumberland for the match so the game could be played.  Norths won the match 45–0 at Wentworth Park and this would prove to be Cumberland's last ever match before disbanding.

Boland played with North Sydney up until the end of 1916 but did not play in the 1914 or 1915 seasons due to his involvement in World War 1.

References

North Sydney Bears players
Rugby league players from Sydney
Rugby league hookers
Rugby league props
Year of birth missing
Year of death missing